Callipielus perforata is a species of moth of the family Hepialidae. It is native to Argentina.

References

External links
 Hepialidae genera

Moths described in 1983
Hepialidae